ALCAP ("Access Link Control Application Part") within a 3rd Generation Universal Mobile Telecommunications System (UMTS) network is the control plane protocol for the transport layer.

Description

ALCAP is defined by 3GPP as equivalent of ITU recommendation Q.2630.2. Basic functionality of ALCAP is multiplexing of different users onto one AAL2 transmission path using channel IDs (CIDs). It is used in the UMTS access network UTRAN along with ATM, while IPBCP is use for IP links in the core of the network.

ALCAP makes it possible for up to 248 channels to be multiplexed onto one AAL2 bearer.

Protocol stack
+----------------+
| ALCAP          |
+----------------+
| SAAL           |
+----------------+          
| AAL5           |
+----------------+
| ATM     bø     |
+----------------+
| Physical layer |
+----------------+

Access Link Control Application Part (ALCAP)

ALCAP is the protocol used for control plane of transport layer UMTS in charge of managing and multiplexing users into ATM AAL2 virtual connections. ALCAP is specified for Iub, Iur and Iu (circuit switched domain) interfaces. This protocol is only used when these interfaces are ATM-based. The ITU-T Q.2630.2 standard, AAL type 2 signalling protocol - Capability Set 2, is chosen for ALCAP protocol.

History

For Iub and Iur interfaces, ALCAP is specified in 3GPP TS 25.426. For Iu interface, ALCAP is specified in 3GPP TS 25.414.

Protocol dependencies

    * STC: Signalling Transport Converter

      SSCOP: the SAAL sublayer that transports ALCAP signaling messages.
    *

      SSCF-NNI, MTP3b: additional layers applicable only for Iur and Iu interfaces.

References

Transport layer protocols
OSI protocols